The White Paper Full Employment in Australia, published in 1945, was the defining document of the official economic policy in Australia until the 1970s. For the first time, the Australian government accepted an obligation to guarantee full employment and to intervene as necessary to implement that guarantee. The preparation of the paper was ordered by The Australian Labor Party Prime Minister John Curtin and his Employment Minister John Dedman and undertaken by a group of economists headed by H.C. Coombs.

The contrasting experiences of the Great Depression and the Second World War convinced the Labor Party that governments could and must intervene to ensure the achievement of full employment. The introduction to the White Paper summed this up:

Despite the need for more houses, food, equipment and every other type of product, before the war not all those available for work were able to find employment or to feel a sense of security in their future. On the average during the twenty years between 1919 and 1939 more than one-tenth of the men and women desiring work were unemployed. In the worst period of the depression well over 25 per cent were left in unproductive idleness. By contrast, during the war no financial or other obstacles have been allowed to prevent the need for extra production being satisfied to the limit of our resources.

The basic ideas behind the White Paper were those set out by John Maynard Keynes in his 1936 work, The General Theory of Employment, Interest and Money. Keynes’ neoclassical contemporaries,  argued that the economy was naturally self-correcting. Unless real wages were held above their market level by union action or government regulation, unemployment could only be a short run phenomenon. The neoclassical economists drew the same conclusion as that of the fundamentalists today — that government action to reduce unemployment could only make matters worse in the long run. Keynes’ first, and perhaps most important, contribution was to show that the economy could remain at high levels of unemployment for indefinite periods in the absence of government action.

As well as demonstrating the possibility of unemployment in equilibrium, Keynes provided an analysis of the causes of periodic unemployment and the basis for a policy response. Keynes argued that recessions and depressions occurred because the economy was destabilised by fluctuations in private demand, and particularly in levels of investment. To simplify, the remedy he advocated was that governments should increase their own demand in periods of depression, particularly through public works. The increase in income generated by public works would then be fed into demand for other goods and services, yielding a stimulus to the private sector.

The White Paper also stressed the importance of what is now called the social wage.
In Australia, a significant contribution to living standards has been made in the past, and will continue to be made, by a high level of social services. Some of these are in the form of direct money payments, such as invalid and old-age pensions, child endowment and widows' pensions. Others are services provided directly by governments and public authorities, including education, health and medical services, kindergartens and libraries. (p12)

Following the end of the postwar economic boom in the 1970s, the ideas of the White Paper were gradually displaced by the encroach of neoliberal orthodoxies, the result of an activist New Right political intervention in the economy. Subsequent generations of Australian economic policy were determined within a market economy paradigm, and full employment policy was abandoned for the recognition of a Non-Accelerating Inflation Rate of Unemployment (NAIRU), which accepted an unemployment level of 5% to drive down wages through job competition.

See also
 Basic wage
 Harvester case

References

Commonwealth of Australia (1945). Full Employment in Australia. Canberra. Australian Government Printer.
 Searchable, on-line version of the 1945 White Paper - 
S. Cornish Full employment in Australia : the genesis of a white paper Canberra: Dept. of Economic History, Faculty of Economics, Australian National University, 1981
 Includes 1945 White Paper

Full employment
Australian labour law
White papers
Employment in Australia